John Tasker Howard (November 30, 1890 – November 20, 1964) was an early American music historian, radio host, writer, lecturer, and composer. His Our American Music, published in 1931, was an early general history of music in the United States.

Howard was the curator in the Music Division of the New York Public Library from 1940 to 1956.

Notes

References

External links
 . Bibliography of Howard, published in 1957
 Papers at the New York Public Library
 Collection of correspondences to and from Howard, Foster Hall Collection, University of Pittsburgh. Section: C869

1890 births
1964 deaths
American male composers
American music historians
20th-century American composers
20th-century American historians
Writers from Brooklyn
Musicians from Brooklyn
New York Public Library people
20th-century American male writers
American male non-fiction writers
Historians from New York (state)
20th-century American male musicians